Nuria Esperanza Piera Gainza (born 29 June 1960) is a Dominican journalist specializing in investigative journalism. Piera is CEO of NCDN, a news production company in CDN (channel 37); she is also owner of Provideo.

Biography
Piera was born in Santo Domingo to immigrants from Spain: her mother was Basque and her father was Catalan. Piera was orphaned at 10 years old when her father, journalist José Enrique Piera Puig, was killed in 1970 by the authoritarian regime of Joaquín Balaguer.

Career
In September 2013, a news investigation led by Piera revealed that the Papal Nuncio of Santo Domingo, Józef Wesołowski, whom Pope Francis had dismissed, was not removed from office due to a dispute he held for three years with Puerto Rican Cardinal Roberto González Nieves, as stated in the Italian and Dominican press and as insinuated by the archbishop of Santo Domingo Cardinal Nicolás de Jesús López Rodríguez, but instead due to the consumption of alcoholic beverages in areas of dubious reputation and abuse of children and adolescent males, This emerged as another scandal of pederasty in the Catholic Church.

In 2014, EFE listed her as one of the most influential women in Ibero-America.

Personal life
Nuria married journalist and broadcaster Pablo McKinney, from whose union was born Nuria's only daughter, Leslie Paola McKinney.

References

1960 births
Living people
Dominican Republic television presenters
Dominican Republic journalists
Dominican Republic television producers
20th-century Dominican Republic lawyers
Dominican Republic people of Basque descent
Dominican Republic people of Catalan descent
Dominican Republic women lawyers
People from Santo Domingo
Dominican Republic women journalists
Spanish expatriates in the Dominican Republic
White Dominicans
Women television producers
Dominican Republic women television presenters